Platte Township is one of twelve townships in Buchanan County, Missouri, USA.  As of the 2010 census, its population was 502.

Platte Township was established in 1839, taking its name from the Platte River.

Geography
It contains six cemeteries: Allen, Frazier, Hebron, Number 6, Tobin and Witts.

The streams of Belcher Branch, Castile Creek, Crabapple Branch, DeMoss Branch, Frazier Branch, Jenkins Branch, Malden Creek and Wolfpen Creek run through this township.

References

External links
 US-Counties.com
 City-Data.com
 USGS Geographic Names Information System (GNIS)

Townships in Buchanan County, Missouri
Townships in Missouri